Tatoosh may refer to:

Tatoosh (yacht), yacht owned by Paul Allen
Tatoosh Island, Washington, United States
Tatoosh Wilderness, Washington, United States
Tatoosh Range, Washington, United States
Tatoosh fire, 2006 fire in Washington and British Columbia